Morrison Records may refer to:
 Morrison Records (Australia), an independent Australian jazz record label
 Morrison Records (Seattle), an independent 20th century Seattle record label